Jacek Wiśniewski (born 7 June 1974) is a Polish former footballer.

Born in Gliwice, Wiśniewski began playing football with the youth side Walce Zabrze and trained as a boxer.

He played professional football as a defender for Górnik Zabrze, Cracovia, Jastrzębie and Ruch Radzionków. Wiśniewski signed a 1.5-year contract with Wisła Płock in 2008. He ended his career with Gwarek Ornontowice, retiring in 2012.

After he retired from playing football, Wiśniewski began a MMA career. He lost to Kamil Waluś in his debut at KSW XX, on September 15, 2012.

References

External links 
 

1974 births
Living people
Polish footballers
Association football defenders
Górnik Zabrze players
MKS Cracovia (football) players
Wisła Płock players
GKS Jastrzębie players
Ruch Radzionków players
Sportspeople from Gliwice